Boston Quackie is a 1957 Warner Bros. Looney Tunes short directed by Robert McKimson. The short was released on June 22, 1957, and stars Daffy Duck and Porky Pig. The cartoon and its title are a parody of the character Boston Blackie.

The films is a spy comedy, featuring a secret agent who has to recover a stolen attaché case.

Plot
Boston Quackie—"Friend to those who need no friends, enemy to those who have no enemies"—is a secret agent enjoying some time off in Paris with his girlfriend Mary and their little dog when his superior, Inspector Faraway, comes to him with an assignment. Faraway hands Quackie an attaché case that must be delivered to the Slobovian consulate in West Slobovia—however, he warns Quackie that "every spy in the country" will attempt to steal it from him! Immediately upon taking custody of the attaché case, Quackie loses it to a mysterious man wearing a green hat, whereupon Quackie, Mary and the inspector give chase.

Quackie follows the thief to a railroad depot station, where they board the Cloak & Dagger Express. As Quackie sneaks along the passenger cars (one of which is labeled "Eléctrique-Chair Car", a nod to the electric chair and to the "chair cars," a.k.a. luxury lounge cars, of the day), a 4-4-2 tender engine No. 12 (and 1434) rings its bell and blows its whistle, which lets out a humongous scream, before the engine starts out, as Quackie manages to grab onto the end of the train. Quackie tries in various ways to prove that the man wears a green hat and thus is the man he's after. The two take tea together, the thief speaking in a Slavic accent, after which the chase resumes. The thief manages to capture Quackie and ties him up in a sack. The thief hangs Quackie at the railroad post office pole and is knocked off the train by a wigwag until Faraway and Mary show up.  Faraway notices Quackie's situation and (unintentionally) puns "Why are you hanging around here for?".  Mary, meanwhile, catches the thief and knocks him out with an anvil-loaded purse. Quackie manages to get out of the bag and eventually prevails, delivering the attaché case to the consulate.

Quackie is dismayed, however, when the consul (a character inspired by Peter Lorre) produces from the case what appears to be a simple, brown instant-coffee jar, whose label reads: "Instructions—Add Water and Pour." Quackie is incredulous, demanding, "You mean, all that hassle just so you could have a coffee break?" The consul pours water into the jar, shakes it, and out pops a beautiful woman in an evening gown and fur wrap—the consul explains that he needed an escort for the embassy ball! Quackie then notices a label on the other side of the jar, which reads: "Acme House Instant Girl." Bemusedly, Quackie remarks: "You know, there just might be a market for this!"

See also
 List of American films of 1957
 List of Daffy Duck cartoons

References

External links
 

Looney Tunes shorts
1957 animated films
1957 short films
1957 films
1950s spy comedy films
Films directed by Robert McKimson
Daffy Duck films
Porky Pig films
Animated films set in Paris
1950s Warner Bros. animated short films
Films scored by Milt Franklyn
1950s parody films
1957 comedy films
Films produced by Edward Selzer
1950s English-language films